Pavlos or Pávlos is a masculine given name. It is a Greek form of Paul. It may refer to:

Pavlos Bakoyannis (1935–1989), a liberal Greek politician
Pavlos Carrer (1829–1896), a Greek composer
Pavlos, Crown Prince of Greece (born 1967)
Pavlos Giannakopoulos (1928–2018), a Greek businessman
Pavlos Haikalis (born 1958), a Greek actor and member of parliament
Pavlos Karakostas (1937–2002), a Greek author
Pavlos Kountouriotis (1855–1935), a Greek naval hero, twice President of Greece
Pavlos Kouroupis (1929–1974), a Greek officer in the Hellenic Army
Pavlos Melas (1870–1904), an officer of the Hellenic Army and hero in the Greek Struggle for Macedonia
Pavlos Papaioannou (born 1959), a Greek footballer
Pavlos Pavlidis (died 1968), a Greek shooter
Pavlos Sidiropoulos (1948–1990), a Greek Rock musician
Pavlos Tassios (1942–2011), a Greek film director
Pavlos Valdaseridis (1892–1972), a Cypriot writer, translator, and playwright

See also
Agios Pavlos (Άγιος Παύλος), a Borough of Thessaloniki
Apostolos Pavlos (Απόστολος Παύλος, meaning Paul the Apostle), a municipality in the Imathia Prefecture, Greece
Pavlos Vrellis Museum of Hellenic History, a museum in Ioannina, Greece

References

See also

Paul (name)

Greek masculine given names
Given names of Greek language origin